Jeopardy! is a British game show based on the US version of the same title. It was originally aired on Channel 4 from January 12, 1983, to July 2, 1984, hosted by Derek Hobson, then was revived by ITV from September 3, 1990, to April 9, 1993, first hosted by Chris Donat in 1990 and then hosted by Steve Jones from 1991 to 1993 and then finally on Sky One from December 4, 1995, to June 7, 1996, hosted by Paul Ross.

On 27 February 2023, ITV announced that the show would be revived for the third time in the autumn (the second time on ITV). This time presented by Stephen Fry.

Transmissions

Channel 4 era

ITV era

Sky One era

Gameplay notes
Unlike in the U.S. version, contestants have points (instead of money) added or subtracted for responses (or lack of) to questions selected, a concession made because of severe restrictions on game show prizes in the UK at the time. The original point values were 5 to 25 in the Jeopardy! Round and 10 to 50 in Double Jeopardy! There were three Daily Doubles in each round. Points became pounds at some point in the Jones run, but later reverted points by the time Ross took over as host.

In the Hobson, Donat, and Jones runs, the contestants only saw their own scores, although, at the end of each round, they were told their relative positions (i.e., who was in first, second, and third place). This had the side effect of reducing "runaways," a common phenomenon in the American show where contestants heading into Final Jeopardy! with more than double their nearest opponent would be guaranteed victory by betting a small amount; most contestants did not pay enough attention to others' correct or incorrect responses to know if they had clinched a runaway game.

Also under Hobson, Donat, Jones and Ross, the response had to be grammatically correct in addition to the usual requirement of phrasing in the form of a question. For example, a response that began "Who is..." when a "What is..." prefix was grammatically correct and the contestant received a penalty.

By the time Ross became host, the points had increased to 100 to 500 for the Jeopardy! round and 200 to 1000 for Double Jeopardy! The Daily Double amount was reduced to the standard one for the Jeopardy! Round and two for Double Jeopardy!.

The contestant leading after Final Jeopardy! won £500 (or whatever total they had in the Jones run when points became pounds). Five consecutive wins increased that champion's winnings to £3,000 with the undefeated champion retiring. When Jones became host, the top three scorers of each of those series played Master Jeopardy! (the equivalent of the Tournament of Champions in the American show) for the grand prize of a holiday. For the 1993 series, the scoring system was changed from points to money, and five-day champions won a £500 bonus.

The Derek Hobson/Channel 4 run of Jeopardy! is based on the original 1964–75 series hosted by Art Fleming.  The 1990 version is based on the Alex Trebek version.

Episodes from the original US version also aired daily mornings on Sky One from July 1995 to December 1996.

References

External links

1983 British television series debuts
1980s British game shows
1990s British game shows
2020s British game shows
British television series based on American television series
British television series revived after cancellation
Jeopardy!
Channel 4 game shows
English-language television shows
ITV game shows
Sky UK original programming
Television shows produced by Thames Television
Television shows produced by Television South (TVS)
Television shows produced by Meridian Broadcasting
Television series by CBS Studios
Television series by Fremantle (company)
Television series by ITV Studios
Television series by Reg Grundy Productions
Television series by Sony Pictures Television